The 2000 NCAA Division I women's basketball tournament began on March 17 and ended on April 2. The tournament featured 64 teams. The Final Four consisted of Connecticut, Penn St., Tennessee, and Rutgers, with Connecticut defeating Tennessee 71-52 to win its second NCAA title. Connecticut's Shea Ralph was named the Most Outstanding Player of the tournament.

Notable events
Two of the number one seeds advanced to the Final four – Tennessee and Connecticut – while two failed to advance. Penn State upset Louisiana Tech in the Midwest Regional, while Rutgers upset Georgia in the West Regional. Tennessee faced Rutgers in one of the Final Four match ups. At the end of the half, the Lady Vols held only a two-point lead 28–26. Pat Summitt challenged her players at halftime, and advised Tamika Catchings to move around more. That advice helped, as Catchings, who had only scored two points in the first half, scored eleven in the second half. Michelle Snow blocked seven shots in the game setting a Final Four record. Kara Lawson ran the offense, and scored a total of 19 points, of which 14 were scored in the second half, and ended up earning the Player of the Game award, helping her team win 64–54 and advance to the national championship.

The other semifinal match up was Connecticut against Penn State. The regional win by Penn State gave the team a chance to play in a Final Four in their home state. The Lady Lions were led by point guard Helen Darling, who would go on to win the Frances Pomeroy Naismith Award that year. However, the defense by the Huskies held Darling scoreless on this day. UConn's point guard Sue Bird, had a better day, scoring 19 points, hitting five of her seven three point attempts. 20,060 fans were in the stands, the largest crowd ever to see a college basketball game in Pennsylvania. Connecticut had a nine-point lead at halftime, but Penn State had cut the lead to five points midway through the second half. However, the Huskies responded, and ended up winning the game by 22 points.

The match up in the finals between Tennessee and Connecticut was highly anticipated. The teams have met ten times prior to this meeting, with each team winning five. In eight of the ten meetings, one of the teams has had a number one ranking in the country. Much has been at stake, not just rankings, but winning streaks, national championships and pride.

Tennessee entered the final game on a 19-game winning streak; Connecticut on a 15-game winning streak, with their only loss of the season coming by a single point at the hands of Tennessee. UConn started the game with a 9–2 run. Kelly Schumacher set a record for blocks in a championship game, and had the record, with six, at halftime. She went on to record nine blocks, setting a new Final Four record, breaking the one established by Tennessee just two days before. The Huskies led 31–19 at the half, but the second half was yet to be played. Any chance of a comeback faded early, as UConn scored eight consecutive points to start the second half. Eight UConn players would get eleven or more minutes, giving Tennessee the impression that they were seeing fresh players every few minutes. Shea Ralph would score 15 points, on her way to winning the Most Outstanding Player award, and Svetlana Abrosimova scored 14. Connecticut ultimately defeated Tennessee by a score of 71–52 to win their second national championship.

The 2000 Final Four, played at the then-First Union Center (now Wells Fargo Center) in Philadelphia, was notable for featuring three head coaches who had ties to the Philadelphia area: Penn State coach Rene Portland grew up in the Philadelphia area, played at Immaculata College (now Immaculata University) in suburban Philadelphia, and briefly coached at St. Joseph's University in Philadelphia; Rutgers coach C. Vivian Stringer coached at then-Cheyney State College (now Cheyney University) in suburban Philadelphia earlier in her career, and national championship-winning Connecticut coach Geno Auriemma spent most of his childhood living in Norristown, Pennsylvania, located approximately 20 miles from Philadelphia, and served as a high school and college assistant coach in the Philadelphia area early in his coaching career.

Tournament records
 Blocks – Kelly Schumacher, Connecticut, recorded nine blocks in the championship game against Tennessee, setting the record for blocks in a Final Four game.
 Blocks – Connecticut recorded eleven blocks in the championship game against Tennessee, setting the record for blocks in a Final Four game.
 Points – Connecticut scored 547 points in the tournament, setting the record for most points scored in an NCAA tournament.
 Field goal percentage – Connecticut hit 203 of 363 field goal attempts(56.1%), setting the record for the field goal percentage in an NCAA tournament.
 Steals – Connecticut recorded 81 steals in the tournament, setting the record for most steals in an NCAA tournament.
 Turnovers – Tennessee turned the ball over 26 times, a record for a championship game.

Qualifying teams – automatic
Sixty-four teams were selected to participate in the 2000 NCAA Tournament. Thirty conferences were eligible for an automatic bid to the 2000 NCAA tournament.

Qualifying teams – at-large
Thirty-four additional teams were selected to complete the sixty-four invitations.

Bids by conference
Thirty conferences earned an automatic bid. In fifteen cases, the automatic bid was the only representative from the conference. Thirty-four additional at-large teams were selected from fifteen of the conferences.

First and second rounds

In 2000, the field remained at 64 teams. The teams were seeded, and assigned to four geographic regions, with seeds 1-16 in each region. In Round 1, seeds 1 and 16 faced each other, as well as seeds 2 and 15, seeds 3 and 14, seeds 4 and 13, seeds 5 and 12, seeds 6 and 11, seeds 7 and 10, and seeds 8 and 9. In the first two rounds, the top four seeds were given the opportunity to host the first-round game. In most cases, the higher seed accepted the opportunity. The exception:
 Third seeded Mississippi State was unable to host, so sixth-seeded Oregon hosted three first- and second-round games

The following table lists the region, host school, venue and the sixteen first- and second-round locations:

Regionals and Final Four

The Regionals, named for the general location, were held from March 25 to March 27 at these sites:
 East Regional  Stuart C. Siegel Center, Richmond, Virginia (Host: Virginia Commonwealth University)
 Mideast Regional  Pyramid Arena, Memphis, Tennessee (Host: University of Memphis)
 Midwest Regional  Municipal Auditorium, Kansas City, Missouri (Host: University of Kansas)
 West Regional  Veterans Memorial Coliseum (Portland), Portland, Oregon (Host: Portland State University)

Each regional winner advanced to the Final Four held March 31 and April 2 in Philadelphia at the Wells Fargo Center (Philadelphia) (Co-hosts: St. Joseph's University and University of Pennsylvania)

Bids by state
The sixty-four teams came from thirty-three states, plus Washington, D.C. Two states, California and Texas, had the most teams with five bids. Seventeen states did not have any teams receiving bids.

Brackets
Data source

East regional – Richmond, Virginia

Midwest regional – Kansas City, Missouri

Mideast regional – Memphis, Tennessee

West regional – Portland, Oregon

Final Four – Philadelphia

Record by conference
Seventeen conferences had more than one bid, or at least one win in NCAA Tournament play:

Thirteen conferences went 0-1: Big Sky Conference, Big South Conference, Big West Conference, Horizon League, Ivy League, MAC, Mid-Continent, MEAC, Ohio Valley Conference, Patriot League, Southern Conference, SWAC, and Trans America

All-Tournament team
 Shea Ralph, Connecticut
 Svetlana Abrosimova, Connecticut
 Sue Bird, Connecticut
 Asjha Jones, Connecticut
 Tamika Catchings, Tennessee

Game officials
 Scott Yarbrough (semifinal)
 Ron Dressander (semifinal)
 Carla Fujimoto (semifinal)
 Bob Trammel (semifinal)
 Wesley Dean (semifinal)
 Bob Trammel (semifinal)
 Sally Bell (final)
 Dennis DeMayo (final)
 Art Bomengen (final)

See also
 2000 NCAA Division I men's basketball tournament
 2000 NCAA Division II women's basketball tournament
 2000 NCAA Division III women's basketball tournament
 2000 NAIA Division I women's basketball tournament
 2000 NAIA Division II women's basketball tournament

Notes 

NCAA Division I women's basketball tournament
 
NCAA Division I women's basketball tournament
NCAA Division I women's basketball tournament